Federal Highway 186 (Carretera Federal 186) is a Federal Highway of Mexico. The highway travels from Villahermosa, Tabasco in the west to Chetumal, Quintana Roo in the east.

References

186